Anu Aiyengar is a finance professional based in Manhattan and Global Co-Head of mergers and acquisitions at JPMorgan Chase & Co, a multinational banking and financial services holding company based in New York City.

Early life 
Aiyengar graduated from Smith College of liberal arts in Massachusetts with an undergraduate degree in Economics and Computer Science, and currently serves as Co-Chair of Smith's Business Advisory Board. Ms. Aiyengar received her MBA from Vanderbilt University. She finds relaxation through Indian classical dance.

Career 
Aiyengar started her career at American Express. While interviewing for a position in 1999 at a major Wall Street investment bank, her interviewer commented 'wrong gender, wrong color, and wrong country'. She currently works at JPMorgan Chase & Co and is head of North American Mergers & Acquisitions responsible for the marketing and execution of advisory assignments in North America. Since 1999, she has advised both domestic and international clients on over US$500 billion worth of transactions including mergers, acquisitions, divestitures / separations, leveraged buyouts, proxy contests, unsolicited transactions and special committee assignments.

Ms. Aiyengar is co-chair of the Investment Bank's women network (WOTM-CIBN), and is involved with several initiatives across J.P. Morgan (Junior Women in Banking, Vice President's Women's Network, Winning Women, Launching Leaders, JumpStart, Early Advantage) and Wall Street (FWA, NoW, WBC, Catalyst) to recruit, mentor and develop women. She is also involved with Asia Society, World Music Institute, and Pratham.

Anu is a panelist and speaker at several events including Women Corporate Directors, Women's Private Equity Summit, The Asian Women in Business, and the South Asian Bar Association Leadership Awards.  She is also a guest lecturer at Harvard Business School, and Chicago Booth; as well as a speaker at several women's businesses conferences across financial organizations, law firms and business schools. Ms. Aiyengar is frequently quoted in the financial press and media.

Awards 
 "Impact and Innovation award" - Dress for Success

Speeches 
 Wall Street Journal's "2019 ANNUAL WOMEN IN FINANCE DINNER" (March 2019).
 Forbes Under 30 (September 2018)

See also 
 Indian Americans in New York City

References 

Living people
Year of birth missing (living people)
Place of birth missing (living people)
Smith College alumni
Vanderbilt University alumni
Indian women bankers
Indian bankers
American people of Indian descent
Businesspeople from New York City
Tamil people
Tamil Brahmins
American Hindus
21st-century American women
Indian emigrants to the United States